Hellbound Train is the eighth album by the band Savoy Brown.

It was released by Parrot in 1972.

Track listing
 "Doin' Fine" (Andy Silvester, Kim Simmonds) – 2:46
 "Lost and Lonely Child" (Simmonds) – 6:00
 "I'll Make Everything Alright" (Simmonds) – 3:18
 "Troubled by these Days and Times" (Paul Raymond) – 5:43
 "If I Could See an End" (Raymond, Simmonds) – 2:54
 "It'll Make You Happy" (Simmonds) – 3:26
 "Hellbound Train" (Silvester, Simmonds) – 9:07

On the U.S. LP, the title track on Side 2 ends abruptly, as if to add dramatic finality. On most cuttings, the song ends just as the cut is brought to the runoff groove. On the Deram U.S. CD, the song fades out. The abrupt ending was restored on the BGO CD release, pairing this album with Street Corner Talking on a single CD.

Personnel
Savoy Brown
Kim Simmonds – guitar, harmonica, vocals
Paul Raymond – guitar, keyboards, vocals
Andy Silvester – bass
Dave Walker – vocals
Dave Bidwell – drums

Additional
Neil Slaven – producer (for Gruggy Woof)
Roy Thomas Baker – engineer
David Anstey – artwork (cover painting and b&w gatefold comic strip)

Recording
Recorded at Trident Studios, London

Charts

References

External links
Savoy Brown's Homepage

1972 albums
Savoy Brown albums
Albums recorded at Trident Studios
Decca Records albums